The  singles Tournament at the Matrix Essentials Evert Cup took place between February 22 and February 29 on the outdoor hard courts of the Indian Wells Tennis Garden in Indian Wells, California, United States. Mary Joe Fernández won the title, defeating Amanda Coetzer in the final.

Seeds

Draw

Finals

Top half

Section 1

Section 2

Bottom half

Section 3

Section 4

References
 Main Draw

Matrix Essentials Evert Cup - Singles